Michael Lavery QC (died April 2019) was a Northern Irish barrister who was active in the Bloody Sunday Inquiry.

References

Date of birth missing
2019 deaths
British barristers
People of The Troubles (Northern Ireland)